Plectroglyphidodon lacrymatus, the whitespotted devil, also known as the jewel damselfish, lives in the Indo-Pacific and can grow up to  in length.

References

External links
 

lacrymatus
Fish described in 1825